Sanjay Pratap Jaiswal (born 12 February 1971) is an Indian politician and a member of 16th and 17th Legislative Assembly of Uttar Pradesh. He represents the Rudhauli constituency of Uttar Pradesh and is a member of the Bharatiya Janata Party.

Early life and education
Sanjay Pratap Jaiswal was born on 12 February 1971 in Purani Basti Basti district of Uttar Pradesh to father Pratap Narayan Jaiswal. In 1990, he enrolled in Kendriya Education Board Children Academy in Dehradun and  attained High School Certificate. He married Sangita Jaiswal on 6 May 1994, with whom he has a son and a daughter.

Political career
Jaiswal has been a member of the 16th and 17th Legislative Assembly of Uttar Pradesh. In 2012 elections, he was elected MLA from Rudhauli (Assembly constituency) as a member of Indian National Congress. He defeated his nearest candidate Rajendra Prasad Chaudhary (Bahujan Samaj Party) by a margin of 5,843 (2.88℅) votes.

In 2017, Jaiswal resigned from Indian National Congress and joined BJP. In 2017 elections, he was again elected MLA from Rudhauli constituency as a member of Bharatiya Janata Party. He defeated Bahujan Samaj Party candidate Rajendra Prasad Chaudhary by a margin of 21,805 (9.80℅) votes.

Posts held

See also
Uttar Pradesh Legislative Assembly

References

Uttar Pradesh MLAs 2017–2022
Uttar Pradesh MLAs 2012–2017
Bharatiya Janata Party politicians from Uttar Pradesh
Living people
1971 births
People from Basti district